Heinrich Ambros Eckert (16 October 1807 – 10 February 1840) was a German painter of battle-pieces. He was born at Würzburg, and was at first instructed by Carl Caspar Fesel (1775-1846). In 1825 he attended the academy at Munich, and afterwards visited the Tyrol and France. Between 1835 and 1840, in conjunction with Monten and Schelver, he published a work upon the German federal army, with two hundred coloured lithographic plates; and another illustrating the return of the Russian troops to their homes. He died at Munich in 1840, while engaged upon a picture of the great review near that city before the Emperor of Russia. Besides genre subjects and battle-pieces he painted marine views.

See also
 List of German painters

References

 

1807 births
1840 deaths
19th-century German painters
19th-century German male artists
German male painters